Awirs is a village of Wallonia and a district of the municipality of Flémalle, located in the province of Liège, Belgium. 

The population on December 31, 2004 was 2,869.

A notable building is the 18th century Château d'Aigremont. A Neanderthal skull, Engis 2, was found in the Schmerling Caves.

Sub-municipalities of Flémalle
Former municipalities of Liège Province